Linda M. Miles (born August 28, 1978) is an American college referee and retired professional wrestler and manager. She worked under the ring name Shaniqua for World Wrestling Entertainment's SmackDown! brand between 2002 and 2004. She co-won the second season of WWE Tough Enough with Jackie Gayda, receiving a one-year contract with the company.

Basketball
Miles was a member of the Rutgers University women's basketball team. She graduated from Rutgers in 2001. In May 2001, she tried out for a roster spot with the Seattle Storm of the WNBA, but was released during the team's training camp. Miles and her Rutgers teammates were featured in a 2004 documentary film of the team's 2000–2001 season entitled This Is A Game, Ladies.  Miles is a graduate of Hughes High School in Cincinnati, Ohio.

Rutgers statistics

Source

Professional wrestling career

World Wrestling Entertainment (2002–2004)

Tough Enough (2002)
In 2002, Miles entered and won the second series of WWE Tough Enough. She and co-winner Jackie Gayda were awarded developmental contracts with the professional wrestling promotion World Wrestling Entertainment. Miles made her in-ring debut on the June 8, 2002 episode of WWE Velocity and faced off against her villainous trainer, Ivory, with Gayda in her corner. Miles lost to Ivory after Gayda turned villainous by pushing her off the top turnbuckle, costing her the match. On the June 13 episode of SmackDown!, Miles teamed with WWE Women's Champion Trish Stratus to defeat the team of Gayda and Ivory. The two divas were then placed on the Raw brand. On the June 24 edition of Raw, Miles teamed with Trish Stratus to defeat Gayda and Molly Holly. Due to Gayda's highly botched mixed tag match on the July 8 edition of Raw, Miles and Gayda were sent to Ohio Valley Wrestling for further training and development.

Miles began a relationship with Shelton Benjamin and began to manage him. It did not last long, however, as Benjamin formed Team Angle with Kurt Angle and Charlie Haas. Miles then disappeared from WWE television.

Return to WWE / SmackDown roster (2003) 
Miles returned to WWE television in June 2003 as a villain under the name Shaniqua, the dominatrix manager of The Basham Brothers. She often interfered in matches, including a match where she surprisingly had to interfere to ensure the Bashams' victory over two jobbers. In the late summer of 2003, Shaniqua began to establish her dominance over the weaker divas. She interfered in the Bourbon Street Bikini Contest on the September 4 episode of Smackdown!, attacking all of the Divas except for Sable, who had escaped. After attacking Dawn Marie and Torrie Wilson, she press slammed Nidia over the top rope. She then began a brief feud with fellow SmackDown! divas Torrie Wilson, Dawn Marie and Nidia. One week after the Bourbon Street Bikini Contest, Dawn Marie challenged Shaniqua to a singles match in which Shaniqua won by disqualification after interferences from Nidia and Wilson, who struck Shaniqua with a steel chair. The following week, Shaniqua defeated Wilson and Nidia  in a handicap match. After said handicap match, the villainous Shaniqua attacked Dawn Marie, who had accompanied Nidia and Wilson to ringside, by delivering a big boot to her chest and then ramming her head into the ring post, proving that while on SmackDown! Linda Miles was the most dominant Diva on the SmackDown! roster. The feud then ended abruptly and Shaniqua was not seen on TV again until the October 2 episode of Smackdown! where she interfered in a match between The APA (Bradshaw and Farooq) and The Basham Brothers, allowing the latter to achieve victory. For her troubles, she was nailed with a "Clothesline From Hell' via Bradshaw and was put out of action for several weeks. She made her return during the No Mercy PPV and gained a measure of retribution on Bradshaw by clubbing him in the back with a night stick during his tag team match against The Bashams. Upon Shaniqua's return, she had new breast implants which were explained via storyline by permanent swelling as a result of the 'Clothesline From Hell' weeks earlier. Shaniqua then spent the next few weeks in The Bashams corner during their feud with Los Guerreros, regularly interfering in matches.

By late 2003 and early 2004, Shaniqua and The Basham Brothers sparked a feud with the then WWE Tag Team Champions Scotty 2 Hotty and Rikishi, with Shaniqua almost being given the Stink Face by Rikishi during house shows weekly between November 2003 and February 2004, but she was never given the actual move. Shaniqua joined her team in a handicap WWE Tag Team championship match against Rikishi and Scotty Too Hotty at No Way Out. Shaniqua's team lost when she was pinned following a Banzai Drop from Rikishi. This marked her last televised appearance with the WWE and she was released from her contract shortly after.

Post-wrestling
Currently, she works as a college basketball referee.

Championships and accomplishments
World Wrestling Entertainment
Tough Enough II - with Jackie Gayda

References

External links
Online World Of Wrestling Profile

1978 births
20th-century African-American sportspeople
20th-century African-American women
21st-century African-American sportspeople
21st-century African-American women
21st-century professional wrestlers
Living people
African-American female professional wrestlers
American female professional wrestlers
Basketball players from Ohio
Parade High School All-Americans (girls' basketball)
Professional wrestlers from Ohio
Professional wrestling managers and valets
Rutgers Scarlet Knights women's basketball players
Sportspeople from Cincinnati
Tough Enough winners